Warmiqucha (Quechua warmi woman, qucha lake, "woman's lake", Hispanicized spellings Huarmi Cocha, Huarmiccocha, Huarmicocha, also Huarmicochas) may refer to:

 Warmiqucha, a lake in the Huancavelica Region, Peru
 Warmiqucha (Cusco), a lake in the Cusco Region, Peru
 Warmiqucha (Junín), a lake in the Junín Region, Peru